The Proximity Print Works, also known as Cone Finishing Plant, is a historic textile mill complex located at Greensboro, Guilford County, North Carolina.  The complex includes nine contributing buildings, two contributing structures, and one contributing object.  It is a large, brick, roughly rectangular collection of industrial buildings constructed in multiple stages beginning in 1913.  It is notable as the first textile printery in the South.  The mill remained in operation until 1977.

It was listed on the National Register of Historic Places in 2014.

References

Textile mills in North Carolina
Industrial buildings and structures on the National Register of Historic Places in North Carolina
Industrial buildings completed in 1913
Buildings and structures in Guilford County, North Carolina
National Register of Historic Places in Guilford County, North Carolina
1913 establishments in North Carolina